151 South African Infantry Battalion was a motorised infantry unit of the South African Army.

History

Origin of the black battalions
By the late 1970s the South African government had abandoned its opposition to arming black soldiers.

By early 1979, the government approved a plan to form a number of regional African battalions, each with a particular ethnic identity, which would either serve in their homelands or under regional SADF commands.

This led to the formation of 151 Battalion for the Southern Sothos.

Troops for 151 SA Battalion were recruited from the self-governing territory of Qwaqwa.

Higher Command
151 Battalion resorted under the command of Group 36.

The battalion was responsible for patrolling the border between Lesotho and South Africa.

Disbandment
151 SA Battalion was disbanded around 1994 and members were assimilated into 1 South African Infantry Battalion and the new SANDF.

Insignia

Leadership

Notes

Peled, A. A question of Loyalty Military Manpower Policy in Multiethinic States, Cornell University Press, 1998,  Chapter 2: South Africa: From Exclusion to Inclusion

References

Infantry battalions of South Africa
Military units and formations of South Africa in the Border War
Military units and formations established in 1980
Military units and formations disestablished in 1994